This is a list of cities that are each surrounded by one other city. A city surrounded by another city or territory is a form of an enclave.

Canada 

Chapais, Quebec, surrounded by Eeyou Istchee James Bay Territory
Chibougamau, Quebec, surrounded by Eeyou Istchee James Bay Territory 
Côte Saint-Luc, Quebec, surrounded by Montreal; though also shares a border with Hampstead and Montreal West
Hampstead, Quebec, surrounded by Montreal; though also shares a border with Côte Saint-Luc
L'Ancienne-Lorette, Quebec, surrounded by Quebec City
Lebel-sur-Quévillon, Quebec, surrounded by Eeyou Istchee James Bay Territory
Matagami, Quebec, surrounded by Eeyou Istchee James Bay Territory
Montreal East, Quebec, surrounded by Montreal; though also has a coast on the St. Lawrence River
Montreal West, Quebec, surrounded by Montreal
Mount Royal, Quebec, surrounded by Montreal
Wendake, Quebec, surrounded by Quebec City
Westmount, Quebec, surrounded by Montreal
White Rock, British Columbia, surrounded by Surrey; though also has a coast on Boundary Bay

Europe 

Alcantarilla, Spain, surrounded by Murcia
City of London, United Kingdom, surrounded by London
City of Westminster, United Kingdom, surrounded by London
Frederiksberg, Denmark, surrounded by Copenhagen
Kauniainen, Finland, surrounded by Espoo
Maletto, Italy, surrounded by Bronte
Međurečje, Bosnia and Herzegovina, surrounded by Priboj, Serbia
Ormideia, Cyprus, surrounded by Dhekelia, Akrotiri and Dhekelia
Pliego, Spain, surrounded by Mula
Vatican City, surrounded by Rome, Italy
Xylotymbou, Cyprus, surrounded by Dhekelia, Akrotiri and Dhekelia

Asia 

 Nahwa, United Arab Emirates, surrounded by Madha, Oman
New Delhi, India, surrounded by Delhi
Taipei, Taiwan, surrounded by New Taipei

Australia 

 Kaltukatjara, Northern Territory, surrounded by Petermann
 Mutitjulu, Northern Territory, surrounded by Petermann
 Yulara, Northern Territory, surrounded by Petermann

United States

Alabama 

 Madison, Alabama, surrounded by Huntsville

Arizona 

 South Tucson, Arizona, surrounded by Tucson

Arkansas 

 Cammack Village, Arkansas, surrounded by Little Rock

California

 Alameda, California, surrounded by Oakland; though also has a coast on San Francisco Bay
Beverly Hills, California, surrounded by Los Angeles; though also shares a border with West Hollywood
Burbank, California, largely surrounded by Los Angeles
Campbell, California, largely surrounded by San Jose
Carson, California, largely surrounded by Los Angeles
Culver City, California, surrounded by Los Angeles; though also shares a border with Ladera Heights
Gardena, California, largely surrounded by Los Angeles
Inglewood, California, largely surrounded by Los Angeles
Newark, California, surrounded by Fremont
Piedmont, California, surrounded by Oakland
Port Hueneme, California, surrounded by Oxnard; though also has a coast on the Pacific Ocean
San Fernando, California, surrounded by Los Angeles
Santa Monica, California, surrounded by Los Angeles; though also has a coast on the Pacific Ocean
Signal Hill, California, surrounded by Long Beach
Villa Park, California, surrounded by Orange
West Hollywood, California, surrounded by Los Angeles

Colorado 

 Glendale, Colorado, surrounded by Denver; within Glendale, there is also a city block of Denver

Florida 

 Baldwin, Florida, surrounded by Jacksonville
 Lazy Lake, Florida, surrounded by Wilton Manors
 Windermere, Florida, surrounded by Lake Butler

Idaho 

 Garden City, Idaho, largely surrounded by Boise

Illinois 

 Harwood Heights, Illinois, surrounded by Chicago; though also shares a border with Norridge
Norridge, Illinois, surrounded by Chicago; though also shares a border with Harwood Heights
Rockdale, Illinois, surrounded by Joliet; within Rockdale, there is also a stretch of road of Joliet

Indiana 

 Beech Grove, Indiana, surrounded by Indianapolis
 Clermont, Indiana, largely surrounded by Indianapolis
 Crows Nest, Indiana, surrounded by Indianapolis; though also shares a border with North Crows Nest and Rocky Ripple
 Cumberland, Indiana, largely surrounded by Indianapolis
 Homecroft, Indiana, surrounded by Indianapolis; though also shares a border with Southport
Lawrence, Indiana, largely surrounded by Indianapolis
Meridian Hills, Indiana, surrounded by Indianapolis; though also shares a border with Williams Creek
North Crows Nest, Indiana, surrounded by Indianapolis; though also shares a border with Crows Nest
Rocky Ripple, Indiana, surrounded by Indianapolis; though also shares a border with Crows Nest
Southport, Indiana, surrounded by Indianapolis; though also shares a border with Homecroft
Speedway, Indiana, surrounded by Indianapolis
Spring Hill, Indiana, surrounded by Indianapolis, though also shares a border with Wynnedale
Warren Park, Indiana, surrounded by Indianapolis
Wynnedale, Indiana, surrounded by Indianapolis; though also shares a border with Spring Hill

Iowa 

 Carter Lake, Iowa, largely surrounded by Omaha, Nebraska
 University Heights, Iowa, surrounded by Iowa City

Kansas 

 Eastborough, Kansas, surrounded by Wichita

Michigan 

 Center Line, Michigan, surrounded by Warren
 East Grand Rapids, Michigan, largely surrounded by Grand Rapids
 Farmington, Michigan, largely surrounded by Farmington Hills
Hamtramck, Michigan, surrounded by Detroit; though also shares a border with Highland Park
Highland Park, Michigan, surrounded by Detroit; though also shares a border with Hamtramck
Lathrup Village, Michigan, surrounded by Southfield
Royal Oak Township, Michigan, largely surrounded by Ferndale; though also shares a border with Oak Park and Detroit
Springfield, Michigan, surrounded by Battle Creek

Minnesota 

 Centerville, Minnesota, surrounded by Lino Lakes
Hilltop, Minnesota, surrounded by Columbia Heights
Landfall, Minnesota, surrounded by Oakdale
Lexington, Minnesota largely surrounded by Blaine
Long Lake, Minnesota, surrounded by Orono
Loretto, Minnesota, surrounded by Medina
Medicine Lake, Minnesota, surrounded by Plymouth
Mendota, Minnesota, surrounded by Mendota Heights
Peterson, Minnesota, surrounded by Rushford Village
Rushford, Minnesota, surrounded by Rushford Village
St. Bonifacius, Minnesota, surrounded by Minnetrista
Willernie, Minnesota, surrounded by Mahtomedi

Missouri 

 Avondale, Missouri, surrounded by Kansas City; though also shares a border with North Kansas City
 Baldwin Park, Missouri, surrounded by Pleasant Hill
 Birmingham, Missouri, surrounded by Kansas City
 Bella Villa, Missouri, surrounded by Lemay
 Country Club Hills, Missouri, surrounded by Jennings
 Country Life Acres, Missouri, surrounded by Town and Country
 Ferrelview, Missouri, surrounded by Kansas City
 Flordell Hills, Missouri, surrounded by Jennings
 Gladstone, Missouri, surrounded by Kansas City; though also shares a border with Oaks, Oakview, Oakwood and Oakwood Park
 Glenaire, Missouri, surrounded by Liberty
 Grandview, Missouri, largely surrounded by Kansas City
 Houston Lake, Missouri, surrounded by Kansas City
 Kimmswick, Missouri, surrounded by Imperial
 Lake Waukomis, Missouri, surrounded by Kansas City; though also shares a border with Platte Woods
 North Kansas City, Missouri, surrounded by Kansas City; though also shares a border with Avondale
 Oaks, Missouri, surrounded by Kansas City; though also shares a border with Gladstone and Oakwood
 Oakview, Missouri, surrounded by Kansas City; though also shares a border with Gladstone and Oakwood Park
 Oakwood, Missouri, surrounded by Kansas City; though also shares a border with Gladstone, Oaks and Oakwood Park
 Oakwood Park, Missouri, surrounded by Kansas City; though also shares a border with Gladstone, Oakview and Oakwood
 Peaceful Village, Missouri, surrounded by High Ridge
 Platte Woods, Missouri, surrounded by Kansas City; though also shares a border with Lake Waukomis
 Randolph, Missouri, surrounded by Kansas City
 Raytown, Missouri, largely surrounded by Kansas City

Montana 

 Walkerville, Montana, surrounded by Butte

Nebraska 

Boys Town, Nebraska, surrounded by Omaha
Ralston, Nebraska, largely surrounded by Omaha

New Jersey 
 Alpha, New Jersey, surrounded by Pohatcong Township
 Branchville, New Jersey, surrounded by Frankford Township
 Chester , New Jersey, surrounded by Chester Township
 Englishtown, New Jersey, surrounded by Manalapan Township
 Farmingdale, New Jersey, surrounded by Howell Township
 Flemington, New Jersey, surrounded by Raritan Township
 Freehold, New Jersey, surrounded by Freehold Township
 Hightstown, New Jersey, surrounded by East Windsor Township
 Hopewell, New Jersey, surrounded by Hopewell Township
 Jamesburg, New Jersey, surrounded by Monroe Township
 Lakehurst, New Jersey, surrounded by Manchester Township
 Lebanon, New Jersey, surrounded by Clinton Township
 Metuchen, New Jersey, surrounded by Edison Townsip
 Morristown, New Jersey, surrounded by Morris Township
 Pennington, New Jersey, surrounded by Hopewell Township
 Sussex, New Jersey, surrounded by Wantage Township
 Swedesboro, New Jersey, surrounded by Woolwich Township
 Tuckerton, New Jersey, surrounded by Little Egg Harbor Township
 Washington, New Jersey, surrounded by Washington Township
 Woodstown, New Jersey, surrounded by Pilesgrove Township

Ohio 

 Bexley, Ohio, surrounded by Columbus
 Bratenahl, Ohio, surrounded by Cleveland
 Elmwood Place, Ohio, surrounded by Cincinnati
 Grandview Heights, Ohio, surrounded by Columbus
 Marble Cliff, Ohio, surrounded by Columbus
 Minerva Park, Ohio, surrounded by Columbus
New Boston, Ohio, largely surrounded by Portsmouth; though also has a coast on the Ohio River
Norwood, Ohio, surrounded by Cincinnati
Obetz, Ohio, largely surrounded by Columbus
St. Bernard, Ohio, surrounded by Cincinnati
Upper Arlington, Ohio, surrounded by Columbus
Whitehall, Ohio, surrounded by Columbus
Worthington, Ohio, surrounded by Columbus

Oklahoma 

 Bethany, Oklahoma, surrounded by Oklahoma City; though also shares a border with Warr Acres

 Mustang, Oklahoma, surrounded by Oklahoma City
 Nichols Hills, Oklahoma, surrounded by Oklahoma City; though also shares a border with The Village
 The Village, Oklahoma, surrounded by Oklahoma City; though also shares a border with Nichols Hills
 Valley Brook, Oklahoma, surrounded by Oklahoma City
 Warr Acres, Oklahoma, surrounded by Oklahoma City; though also shares a border with Bethany
 Woodlawn Park, Oklahoma, surrounded by Bethany, Oklahoma; which is itself surrounded by Oklahoma City

Pennsylvania 

 Adamsburg, Pennsylvania, surrounded by Hempfield Township
 Addison, Pennsylvania, surrounded by Addison Township
 Alexandria, Pennsylvania, surrounded by Porter Township
 Altoona, Pennsylvania, largely surrounded by Logan Township; within Altoona, there are also 2 enclaves of Logan Township
 Armagh, Pennsylvania, surrounded by East Wheatfield Township
 Arona, Pennsylvania, surrounded by Hempfield Township
 Avis, Pennsylvania, surrounded by Pine Creek Township
 Beavertown, Pennsylvania, surrounded by Beaver Township
 Bellefonte, Pennsylvania, surrounded by Spring Township
 Bellwood, Pennsylvania, surrounded by Antis Township
 Bendersville, Pennsylvania, surrounded by Menallen Township
 Berlin, Pennsylvania, surrounded by Brothersvalley Township
 Bessemer, Pennsylvania, surrounded by North Beaver Township
 Bethany, Pennsylvania, surrounded by Dyberry Township
 Biglerville, Pennsylvania, surrounded by Butler Township
 Blain, Pennsylvania, surrounded by Jackson Township
 Blairsville, Pennsylvania, surrounded by Burrell Township
 Bloomfield, Pennsylvania, surrounded by Centre Township
 Bonneauville, Pennsylvania, surrounded by Mount Pleasant Township
 Boswell, Pennsylvania, surrounded by Jenner Township
 Brisbin, Pennsylvania, largely surrounded by Woodward Township
 Broad Top City, Pennsylvania, largely surrounded by Carbon Township
 Brookville, Pennsylvania, surrounded by Snyder Township
 Bruin, Pennsylvania, surrounded by Parker Township
 Burgettstown, Pennsylvania, surrounded by Smith Township
 Burnham, Pennsylvania, surrounded by Derry Township
 Callensburg, Pennsylvania, surrounded by Licking Township
 Callimont, Pennsylvania, largely surrounded by Larimer Township
 Canton, Pennsylvania, surrounded by Canton Township
 Carmichaels, Pennsylvania, surrounded by Cumberland Township
 Cassville, Pennsylvania, surrounded by Cass Township
 Central City, Pennsylvania, surrounded by Shade Township
 Centre Hall, Pennsylvania, surrounded by Potter Township
 Chicora, Pennsylvania, largely surrounded by Donegal Township
 Clarendon, Pennsylvania, surrounded by Mead Township
 Claysville, Pennsylvania, surrounded by Donegal Township
 Clearfield, Pennsylvania, surrounded by Lawrence Township
 Clintonville, Pennsylvania, surrounded by Clinton Township
 Clymer, Pennsylvania, surrounded by Cherryhill Township
 Coalmont, Pennsylvania, surrounded by Carbon Township
 Coalport, Pennsylvania, surrounded by Beccaria Township
 Coaldale, Pennsylvania, surrounded by Broad Top Township
 Conneaut Lake, Pennsylvania, surrounded by Sadsbury Township
 Cooperstown, Pennsylvania, surrounded by Jackson Township
 Coudersport, Pennsylvania, surrounded by Eulalia Township
 Creekside, Pennsylvania, surrounded by Washington Township
 Cresson, Pennsylvania, surrounded by Cresson Township
 Curwensville, Pennsylvania, surrounded by Pike Township
 Darlington, Pennsylvania, surrounded by Darlington Township
 Dayton, Pennsylvania, surrounded by Wayne Township
 Derry, Pennsylvania, surrounded by Derry Township
 Driftwood, Pennsylvania, surrounded by Gibson Township
 DuBois, Pennsylvania, surrounded by Sandy Township
 Dudley, Pennsylvania, surrounded by Carbon Township
 Dunbar, Pennsylvania, surrounded by Dunbar Township
 Dushore, Pennsylvania, surrounded by Cherry Township
 Eagles Mere, Pennsylvania, surrounded by Shrewsbury Township
 East Lansdowne, Pennsylvania, surrounded by Upper Darby Township
 Ebensburg, Pennsylvania, surrounded by Cambria Township
 Edinboro, Pennsylvania, surrounded by Washington Township
 Elderton, Pennsylvania, surrounded by Plumcreek Township
 Eldred, Pennsylvania, surrounded by Eldred Township
 Elmhurst Township, Pennsylvania, surrounded by Roaring Brook Township
 Emporium, Pennsylvania, surrounded by Shippen Township
 Ernest, Pennsylvania, surrounded by Rayne Township
 Everett, Pennsylvania, surrounded by West Providence Township
 Export, Pennsylvania, surrounded by Murrysville Municipality
 Fairchance, Pennsylvania, surrounded by Georges Township
 Fairfield, Pennsylvania, surrounded by Hamiltonban Township
 Fairview, Pennsylvania, surrounded by Fairview Township
 Finleyville, Pennsylvania, surrounded by Union Township
 Freeburg, Pennsylvania, surrounded by Washington Township
 Garrett, Pennsylvania, surrounded by Summit Township
 Girard, Pennsylvania, surrounded by Girard Township
 Grampian, Pennsylvania, surrounded by Penn Township
 Great Bend, Pennsylvania, surrounded by Great Bend Township
 Greencastle, Pennsylvania, surrounded by Antrim Township
 Greensburg, Pennsylvania, surrounded by Hempfield Township; though also shares a border with Southwest Greensburg
 Grove City, Pennsylvania, surrounded by Pine Township
 Hallstead, Pennsylvania, surrounded by Great Bend Township
 Harrisville, Pennsylvania, surrounded by Mercer Township
 Homer City, Pennsylvania, surrounded by Center Township
 Homewood, Pennsylvania, surrounded by Big Beaver Borough
 Honey Brook, Pennsylvania, surrounded by Honey Brook Township
 Hookstown, Pennsylvania, surrounded by Greene Township
 Houtzdale, Pennsylvania, surrounded by Woodward Township
 Howard, Pennsylvania, surrounded by Howard Township
 Hughesville, Pennsylvania, surrounded by Wolf Township
 Hunker, Pennsylvania, largely surrounded by Hempfield Township
 Hyndman, Pennsylvania, surrounded by Londonderry Township
 Indian Lake, Pennsylvania, surrounded by Stonycreek Township
 Indiana, Pennsylvania, surrounded by White Township
 Irvona, Pennsylvania, surrounded by Beccaria Township
 Irwin, Pennsylvania, surrounded by North Huntingdon Township
 Jefferson, Pennsylvania. surrounded by Jefferson Township
 Jennerstown, Pennsylvania, surrounded by Jenner Township
 Johnsonburg, Pennsylvania, surrounded by Ridgway Township
 Juniata Terrace, Pennsylvania, surrounded by Granville Township
 Kane, Pennsylvania, surrounded by Wetmore Township
 Karns City, Pennsylvania, surrounded by Fairview Township
 Kennett Square, Pennsylvania, surrounded by Kennett Township
 Knox, Pennsylvania, surrounded by Beaver Township
 Lake City, Pennsylvania, surrounded by Girard Township; though also has a coast on Lake Erie
 Landisburg, Pennsylvania, surrounded by Tyrone Township
 Laporte, Pennsylvania, surrounded by Laporte Township
 LeRaysville, Pennsylvania, surrounded by Pike Township
 Liberty, Pennsylvania surrounded by Liberty Township
 Lilly, Pennsylvania, surrounded by Washington Township
 Linesville, Pennsylvania, surrounded by Pine Township
 Loganton, Pennsylvania, surrounded by Greene Township
 Loretto, Pennsylvania, surrounded by Allegheny Township
 Mahaffey, Pennsylvania, surrounded by Bell Township
 Manns Choice, Pennsylvania, surrounded by Harrison Township
 Mansfield, Pennsylvania, surrounded by Richmond Township
 Mapleton, Pennsylvania, largely surrounded by Union Township
 Marion Center, Pennsylvania, surrounded by East Mahoning Township
 Markleysburg, Pennsylvania, surrounded by Henry Clay Township
 Mars, Pennsylvania, surrounded by Adams Township
 Martinsburg, Pennsylvania, surrounded by North Woodbury Township
 McSherrystown, Pennsylvania, surrounded by Conewago Township
 Meyersdale, Pennsylvania, surrounded by Summit Township
 Middleburg, Pennsylvania, surrounded by Franklin Township
 Mifflin, Pennsylvania, surrounded by Milford Township
 Mifflintown, Pennsylvania, surrounded by Fermanagh Township
 Milesburg, Pennsylvania, surrounded by Boggs Township
 Mill Hall, Pennsylvania, surrounded by Bald Eagle Township
 Mill Village, Pennsylvania, surrounded by LeBoeuf Township
 Millheim, Pennsylvania, largely surrounded by Penn Township
 Modena, Pennsylvania, largely surrounded by East Fallowfield Township
 Monroe, Pennsylvania, surrounded by Monroe Township
 Mont Alto, Pennsylvania, surrounded by Quincy Township
 Montgomery, Pennsylvania, surrounded by Clinton Township
 Montrose, Pennsylvania, surrounded by Bridgewater Township
 Mount Holly Springs, Pennsylvania, surrounded by South Middleton Township
 Mount Jewett, Pennsylvania, surrounded by Hamlin Township
 Mount Oliver, Pennsylvania, surrounded by Pittsburgh City
 Muncy, Pennsylvania, surrounded by Muncy Creek Township
 New Albany, Pennsylvania, surrounded by Albany Township
 New Baltimore, Pennsylvania, surrounded by Allegheny Township
 New Centerville, Pennsylvania, surrounded by Milford Township
 New Galilee, Pennsylvania, surrounded by Big Beaver Borough
 New Milford, Pennsylvania, surrounded by New Milford Township
 New Oxford, Pennsylvania, surrounded by Oxford Township
 New Paris, Pennsylvania, surrounded by Napier Township
 New Stanton, Pennsylvania, surrounded by Hempfield Township
 Newburg, Pennsylvania, surrounded by Hopewell Township
 Newry, Pennsylvania, surrounded by Blair Township
 Newton Hamilton, Pennsylvania, surrounded by Wayne Township
 Nicholson, Pennsylvania, surrounded by Nicholson Township
 North East, Pennsylvania, surrounded by North East Township
 Ohiopyle, Pennsylvania, surrounded by Stewart Township
 Orbisonia, Pennsylvania, surrounded by Cromwell Township
 Orrstown, Pennsylvania, surrounded by Southampton Township
 Pennsbury Village, Pennsylvania, surrounded by Robinson Township
 Perryopolis, Pennsylvania, surrounded by Perry Township
 Petersburg, Pennsylvania, surrounded by Logan Township
 Petrolia, Pennsylvania, surrounded by Fairview Township
 Pitcairn, Pennsylvania, surrounded by Monroeville Municipality
 Pleasantville, Pennsylvania, surrounded by West St. Clair Township
 Plumville, Pennsylvania, surrounded by South Mahoning Township
 Port Allegany, Pennsylvania, surrounded by Liberty Township
 Port Matilda, Pennsylvania, surrounded by Worth Township
 Port Royal, Pennsylvania, surrounded by Milford Township
 Portage, Pennsylvania, surrounded by Portage Township
 Putnam, Pennsylvania, surrounded by Covington Township
 Rainsburg, Pennsylvania, surrounded by Colerain Township
 Ridgway, Pennsylvania, surrounded by Ridgway Township
 Roaring Spring, Pennsylvania, surrounded by Taylor Township
 Rockhill, Pennsylvania, surrounded by Cromwell Township
 Rome, Pennsylvania, surrounded by Rome Township
 Roseville, Pennsylvania, surrounded by Rutland Township
 Rouseville, Pennsylvania, surrounded by Cornplanter Township
 Rural Valley, Pennsylvania, surrounded by Cowanshannock Township
 Rutledge, Pennsylvania, largely surrounded by Ridley Township
 S.N.P.J., Pennsylvania, surrounded by North Beaver Township
 Salisbury, Pennsylvania, surrounded by Elk Lick Township
 Salladasburg, Pennsylvania, surrounded by Mifflin Township
 Saltillo, Pennsylvania, surrounded by Clay Township
 Sandy Lake, Pennsylvania, surrounded by Sandy Creek Township
 Sankertown, Pennsylvania, surrounded by Cresson Township
 Schellsburg, Pennsylvania, surrounded by Napier Township
 Seven Springs, Pennsylvania, largely surrounded by Middlecreek Township
 Shade Gap, Pennsylvania, surrounded by Dublin Township
 Shanksville, Pennsylvania, surrounded by Stonycreek Township
 Sheakleyville, Pennsylvania, surrounded by Sandy Creek Township
 Shelocta, Pennsylvania, surrounded by Armstrong Township
 Shippenville, Pennsylvania, surrounded by Elk Township
 Shirleysburg, Pennsylvania, surrounded by Shirley Township
 Slippery Rock, Pennsylvania, surrounded by Slippery Rock Township
 Smethport, Pennsylvania, surrounded by Keating Township
 Smicksburg, Pennsylvania, surrounded by West Mahoning Township
 Smithfield, Pennsylvania, surrounded by Georges Township
 Snow Shoe, Pennsylvania, surrounded by Snow Shoe Township
 Somerset, Pennsylvania, surrounded by Somerset Township
 South Greensburg, Pennsylvania, surrounded by Hempfield Township; though also shares a border with Southwest Greensburg
 Southwest Greensburg, Pennsylvania, surrounded by Hempfield Township; though also shares a border with Greensburg and South Greensburg
 Spartansburg, Pennsylvania, surrounded by Sparta Township
 Springboro, Pennsylvania, surrounded by Spring Township
 St. Clairsville, Pennsylvania, surrounded by East St. Clair Township
 St. Petersburg, Pennsylvania, surrounded by Richland Township
 Stoystown, Pennsylvania, surrounded by Quemahoning Township
 Strattanville, Pennsylvania, surrounded by Clarion Township
 Stroudsburg, Pennsylvania, largely surrounded by Stroud Township
 Sugar Grove, Pennsylvania, surrounded by Sugar Grove Township
 Summerhill, Pennsylvania, largely surrounded by Croyle Township
 Summerville, Pennsylvania, surrounded by Clover Township
 Sylvania, Pennsylvania, surrounded by Columbia Township
 Thompson, Pennsylvania, surrounded by Thompson Township
 Thompsontown, Pennsylvania, surrounded by Delaware Township
 Three Springs, Pennsylvania, surrounded by Clay Township
 Tioga, Pennsylvania, surrounded by Tioga Township
 Tionesta, Pennsylvania, surrounded by Tionesta Township
 Troutville, Pennsylvania, surrounded by Brady Township
 Troy, Pennsylvania, surrounded by Troy Township
 Tyrone, Pennsylvania, surrounded by Snyder Township
 Union City, Pennsylvania, surrounded by Union Township
 Unionville, Pennsylvania, surrounded by Union Township
 Ursina, Pennsylvania, surrounded by Lower Turkeyfoot Township
 Vanderbilt, Pennsylvania, surrounded by Dunbar Township
 Waterford, Pennsylvania, surrounded by Waterford Township
 Waynesboro, Pennsylvania, surrounded by Washington Township
 Waynesburg, Pennsylvania, surrounded by Franklin Township
 West Grove, Pennsylvania, surrounded by London Grove Township
 West Middlesex, Pennsylvania, surrounded by Shenango Township
 West Middletown, Pennsylvania, surrounded by Hopewell Township
 West Sunbury, Pennsylvania, surrounded by Clay Township
 West View, Pennsylvania, surrounded by Ross Township
 Westfield, Pennsylvania, surrounded by Westfield Township
 Wilmore, Pennsylvania, surrounded by Summerhill Township
 Worthington, Pennsylvania, surrounded by West Franklin Township
 Youngstown, Pennsylvania, surrounded by Unity Township
 Youngsville, Pennsylvania, surrounded by Brokenstraw Township
 Youngwood, Pennsylvania, surrounded by Hempfield Township

Tennessee 

 Red Bank, Tennessee, surrounded by Chattanooga

Texas 

 Alamo Heights, Texas, surrounded by San Antonio; though also shares a border with Terrell Hills
 Balcones Heights, Texas, surrounded by San Antonio
Benbrook, Texas, largely surrounded by Fort Worth
Bellaire, Texas, surrounded by Houston
Beverly Hills, Texas, surrounded by Waco
Blue Mound, Texas, surrounded by Fort Worth; though also shares a border with Sagniaw
Castle Hills, Texas, surrounded by San Antonio
Cockrell Hill, Texas, surrounded by Dallas
Dalworthington Gardens, Texas, surrounded by Arlington; though also shares a border with Pantego
Everman, Texas, largely surrounded by Fort Worth
Forest Hill, Texas, largely surrounded by Fort Worth
Haslet, Texas, surrounded by Fort Worth
Highland Park, Texas, surrounded by Dallas; though also shares a border with University Park
Hill Country Village, Texas, surrounded by San Antonio; though also shares a border with Hollywood Park
Hollywood Park, Texas, surrounded by San Antonio; though also shares a border with Hill Country Village
Kirby, Texas, largely surrounded by San Antonio
Lake Worth, Texas, surrounded by Fort Worth; though also shares a border with Sansom Park
Lakeside, Texas, largely surrounded by Fort Worth
Leon Valley, Texas, surrounded by San Antonio
Memorial Villages, Texas, surrounded by Houston
Olmos Park, Texas, surrounded by San Antonio
Pantego, Texas, surrounded by Arlington; though also shares a border with Dalworthington Gardens
River Oaks, Texas, surrounded by Fort Worth; though also shares a border with Sansom Park
Saginaw, Texas, surrounded by Fort Worth; though also shares a border with Blue Mound
Rollingwood, Texas, surrounded by Austin; though also shares a border with West Lake Hills
Southside Place, Texas surrounded by Houston; though also shares a border with West University Place
Sansom Park, Texas, surrounded by Fort Worth; though also shares a border with Lake Worth and River Oaks
Shavano Park, Texas, surrounded by San Antonio
Sunset Valley, Texas, surrounded by Austin
Terrell Hills, Texas, surrounded by San Antonio; though also shares a border with Alamo Heights
The Hills, Texas, surrounded by Lakeway
University Park, Texas, surrounded by Dallas; though also shares a border with Highland Park 
West Lake Hills, Texas, surrounded by Austin; though also shares a border with Rollingwood
West University Place, Texas, surrounded by Houston; though also shares a border with Southside Place
Westworth Village, Texas, surrounded by Fort Worth; though also shares a border with White Settlement
Westover Hills, Texas, surrounded by Fort Worth
Windcrest, Texas, largely surrounded by San Antonio
White Settlement, Texas, surrounded by Fort Worth; though also shares a border with Westworth Village

Washington 

 Beaux Arts Village, Washington, surrounded by Bellevue; though also has a coast on Lake Washington
Ruston, Washington, surrounded by Tacoma; though also has a coast on Commencement Bay

Wisconsin 

Maple Bluff, Wisconsin, surrounded by Madison
Monona, Wisconsin, surrounded by Madison
North Bay, Wisconsin, surrounded by Racine; though also has a coast on Lake Michigan
Paddock Lake, Wisconsin, largely surrounded by Salem Lakes
Shorewood Hills, Wisconsin, surrounded by Madison
Sturtevant, Wisconsin, surrounded by Mount Pleasant
Thiensville, Wisconsin, surrounded by Mequon
Union Grove, Wisconsin, largely surrounded by Yorkville

Notes

References

Surrounded